<|°_°|> (also known as Robot Face or Robot) is the third studio album by the French electronic group Caravan Palace, released on 16 October 2015.

Track listing

, the animated music video for “Lone Digger”, which depicts a violent fight in a strip club staffed and patronized by various anthropomorphic animals, has over 370 million views on YouTube. Also as of December 2019, the song was certified gold by RIAA. The song was also featured in the 2022 Disney movie Strange World.

Charts

In 2016, it was awarded a silver certification from the Independent Music Companies Association which indicated sales of at least 20,000 copies in Europe.

References

2015 albums
Caravan Palace albums